The North Landing River is a river in the U.S. states of Virginia and North Carolina.

See also
List of rivers of North Carolina
List of rivers of Virginia

References

USGS Hydrologic Unit Map - State of Virginia (1974)

Rivers of Virginia
Rivers of North Carolina
Tributaries of Albemarle Sound